Johnson's Russia List (JRL) is an email newsletter containing Russia-related news and analysis in English.  David Johnson is the list's editor.  Johnson's Russia List generally comes out one  time per day. Johnson's Russia List's content includes articles syndicated from other media outlets, as well as comments contributed by its readers.  The JRL is a nonprofit project currently sponsored through the Institute for European, Russian, and Eurasian Studies (IERES) at The George Washington University's Elliott School of International Affairs. It was previously a project at the Center for Defense Information and World Security Institute.

External links
Johnson's Russia List website
JRL announcement by IERES webpage 
World Security Institute website
Center for Defense Information website

Newsletters
Elliott School of International Affairs